Charles William Wordsworth (9 September 1877 – 10 June 1960) was an Australian cricketer. He played first-class cricket for New South Wales and Otago between 1907 and 1910.

See also
 List of New South Wales representative cricketers
 List of Otago representative cricketers

References

External links
 

1877 births
1960 deaths
Australian cricketers
New South Wales cricketers
Otago cricketers
Cricketers from Rotherham